Mr. D's Greek Delicacies (sometimes Mr. D's Greek Deli) is a Greek restaurant at Seattle's Pike Place Market, in the U.S. state of Washington.

Description 
Mr. D's Greek Delicacies is a Greek restaurant in Pike Place Market's Triangle Building, in Seattle's Central Waterfront district. The menu includes gyros, and the business also sells feta and pita.

History 
The business is owned by Demetrios Moraitis, who also owns  Mr. D's Greek Restaurant and Lounge. He is known for sculpting famous people out of meat. During the COVID-19 pandemic, the restaurant operated via take-out and delivery, and utilized a "pop-up" patio for outdoor dining.

Reception 
Seattle Metropolitan says, "If 'yeeros' at Mr. D's charmingly worn street-eats shop stretch the word delicacies—meat a smidge too salty, tzatziki more like a yogurty ranch dressing—they're still satisfying as hell." In Seattle Magazine 2013 guide to "cheap eats" in Seattle, Leslie Kelly and Allison Austin Scheff wrote: 

Sonja Groset included Mr. D's in Eater Seattle's 2015 "guide to the best cheap eats" at Pike Place Market.

See also 

 List of Greek restaurants

References

External links 

 
 Mr. D's Greek Delicacies at Pike Place Market
 Mr D's Greek Delicacies at Zomato

Central Waterfront, Seattle
European restaurants in Seattle
Greek restaurants in Washington (state)
Pike Place Market